Linda S. Bolon (born June 22, 1948) is a Democratic politician who served as a member of the Ohio House of Representatives, representing the 1st District from 2007 to 2010 for 2 terms. A lifelong resident of Columbiana County, Mrs. Bolon graduated from Columbus University. She began a career in auditing, serving as the treasurer of the East Palestine School District before moving on to serve as an auditor for the State of Ohio under former State Auditor, Thomas Ferguson.

In 1995, Mrs. Bolon was elected to the East Palestine City Council, serving in the capacity of a councilwoman for four years, until becoming Columbiana County Treasurer in 1999. Originally appointed, she won election to a full term in 2000. She won a second full term in 2004.

With Republican Chuck Blasdel running for Congress in 2006, Mrs. Bolon sought his open seat in the Ohio House of Representatives. Facing Jim Hoppel, a county commissioner, she won easily and won reelection in 2008 to a second term.

By her second term, Mrs. Bolon was serving in various leadership positions, notably as majority whip. She also served in Finance and Appropriations, Local and Municipal Government and Urban Revitalization as well as Ways and Means. However in 2010, Republicans saw her as a potential pick-up, although not a top tier target. In an overwhelmingly Republican year, Mrs. Bolon was defeated by political newcomer Craig Newbold for the State Representative seat. Following her defeat, Mrs. Bolon returned to Columbiana County where she served as the Columbiana County Treasurer again from 2013 - 2021 serving a total of 4 terms.

One of her biggest goals for Columbiana County was to personally recover the $20.4 million dollars that was illegally invested by a previous county treasurer, Ardel Strabala.

https://caselaw.findlaw.com/oh-court-of-appeals/1087184.html

"On or about September 14, 1993, appellant discovered that the Columbiana County Treasurer, Ardel Strabala (“Strabala”), had illegally invested and/or diverted county funds through his son, Steven Strabala.  As a result of this activity, the county experienced significant losses. Strabala subsequently pled guilty to having an unlawful interest in a public contract pursuant to R.C. 2921.42(A)(2)."

Mrs. Bolon may have recovered around $8–11 million in her tenure but the bounty for the rest remains on his son to repay the county.

References

External links
The Ohio Ladies' Gallery: Rep. Linda Bolon (D-Columbiana)
Linda S. Bolon for State Representative campaign website
Project Vote Smart - Representative Linda S. Bolon (OH) profile
https://web.archive.org/web/20080515194212/http://www.lindabolon.com/
https://caselaw.findlaw.com/oh-court-of-appeals/1087184.html

Democratic Party members of the Ohio House of Representatives
1955 births
Living people
Women state legislators in Ohio
People from Columbiana, Ohio
21st-century American politicians
21st-century American women politicians
People from East Palestine, Ohio